Craig of the Creek is an American animated television series created by Matt Burnett and Ben Levin for Cartoon Network. The show's pilot episode premiered on the Cartoon Network app on December 1, 2017, and the first episode of its first season ("Itch To Explore") was previewed there on February 19, 2018, before officially premiering on Cartoon Network on March 30 of that year, alongside its second episode ("You're It"). The season consisted of 40 episodes of 11 minutes each and concluded on March 11, 2019.

The second season ran from March 18, 2019, until June 11, 2020, and totaled 38 episodes, of which two ("The Other Side" and "Craig and the Kid's Table") are double-length. The third season premiered with a double-length episode ("The Other Side: The Tournament") on June 21, 2020. The fourth season premiered with a special episode ("The Legend of the Library").  Additionally, five shorts were aired in late 2019.

Series overview

Episodes

Pilot (2017)

Season 1 (2018–19)

Season 2 (2019–20)

Season 3 (2020–21)

Season 4 (2021–22)

Shorts (2019)
On the streaming services HBO Max and Hulu, these shorts are combined to make an episode titled "Creek Shorts," listed under season 3.

Notes

References

Lists of American children's animated television series episodes
Lists of Cartoon Network television series episodes